Terence Farmer (11 May 1931 – 9 May 2014) was an English footballer.

Career
Farmer joined Rotherham United from Gainsborough Trinity in July 1952. After making 61 appearances and scoring 24 goals in the league, he joined York City in January 1958. He featured prominently for the club as they won promotion to the Third Division and scored the goal which won promotion against Aldershot in April 1959. He joined Scarborough in July 1960, after making 67 appearances and scoring 28 goals. He died on 9 May 2014.

Notes

English footballers
Association football forwards
Gainsborough Trinity F.C. players
Rotherham United F.C. players
York City F.C. players
Scarborough F.C. players
People from Maltby, South Yorkshire
1931 births
2014 deaths